Polysphincta is a genus belonging to the family Ichneumonidae subfamily Pimplinae.

Species
Polysphincta boops Tschek, 1868 
Polysphincta clypeata Holmgren, 1860 
Polysphincta longa Kasparyan, 1976 
Polysphincta nielseni Roman, 1923 
Polysphincta rufipes Gravenhorst, 1829 
Polysphincta tuberosa (Gravenhorst, 1829) 
Polysphincta vexator Fitton, Shaw & Gauld, 1988

References

Pimplinae